Messelobunodon is an extinct genus of early even-toed ungulate.

References

Dichobunids
Eocene even-toed ungulates
Fossils of Germany
Fossil taxa described in 1980
Prehistoric even-toed ungulate genera